Chrissie Fit (born April 3, 1984) is an American actress. In 2007, Fit rose to prominence after she was cast as the character Mercedes Juarez in the medical drama, General Hospital. She also played the roles of CheeChee in the DCOMs Teen Beach Movie and Teen Beach 2, and Florencia "Flo" Fuentes in Pitch Perfect 2 and Pitch Perfect 3.

Early life
Fit was born in Miami, Florida, and raised in nearby Hialeah, Florida. She is of Cuban heritage. She attended Florida International University where she was a member of the Theta Xi chapter of Alpha Xi Delta.

Career
Fit made her acting debut on the 2006 Nickelodeon television series, Zoey 101, in an unspecified role.  She made her first recurring role on the American daytime television medical drama, General Hospital, where she played Mercedes from 2007 until 2012. She also wrote, directed and starred in the web series, The Subpranos, playing the role of Denise Flores de la Rosa. She also appeared in episodes of Southland, House, General Hospital: Night Shift and The Middleman. In 2012, Fit returned to acting with Filly Brown, where she played Lupe Tonorio.

In 2013, she was cast as CheeChee in the Disney Channel Original Movie, Teen Beach Movie. In 2015, she played Florencia "Flo" Fuentes in Pitch Perfect 2 and reprised her role as CheeChee in the DCOM Teen Beach 2. She later returned as Florencia in 2017's Pitch Perfect 3.

Philanthropy 
Fit is a Days for Girls International Ambassador, using her platform to champion menstrual solutions and health education for women and girls all over the world. She co-wrote and performed a song, "All About Them Days (for Girls)" to support the organization's mission in March 2018.

Filmography

Film

Television

Music videos

Web

Theater

References

External links 
 
 

1984 births
Living people
Actresses from Miami
American entertainers of Cuban descent
American film actresses
American television actresses
People from Hialeah, Florida
21st-century American actresses